Eurema nicevillei, the Malayan grass yellow, is a butterfly in the family Pieridae.  It is found in Thailand, southern Burma, Peninsular Malaysia, Borneo, and Sumatra.

The upperside ground colour is lemon yellow. The forewing black basal border is always well developed along the tornus to wing base with its inner margin almost uniform, having yellow veins in the basal portion. The hindwing black distal costal is broad and slightly broadened toward the tornus. The underside of the forewing has a spot in the discoidal cell. The hindwing has a series of faint
submarginal spots arranged in a curved line parallel to the wing margin.

The name honours Lionel de Niceville

References

nicevillei
Butterflies described in 1891
Butterflies of Borneo
Butterflies of Indochina